The !Khukaǁgamma  or Sundaysriver is a river in the Eastern Cape Province of South Africa. It is said to be the fastest flowing river in the country. The Inqua Khoi people, who historically were the wealthiest group in Southern Africa, originally named this river !Khukaǁgamma (the waters with the spirit of abundance) because the river's banks are always green and grassy despite the arid terrain that it runs through.

Presently this river is part of the Fish to Tsitsikamma Water Management Area.

Course
The river then flows in a general South/Southeasterly direction, passing the town Graaff-Reinet in the Karoo before winding its way through the Zuurberg Mountains and then past Kirkwood and Addo in the fertile Sundays River Valley. It empties into the Indian Ocean at Algoa Bay after flowing through the village of Colchester, 40 km east of the city of Gqeberha.
Dams
 Darlington Dam
 Nqweba Dam

Fish-Sundays River Canal Scheme
The Fish River-Sundays River Canal Scheme consists of a canal and tunnel system which supplies water from the Orange River to the Great Fish River Valley and subsequently to the Sundays River Valley in order to supplement the existing water supply of the Eastern Cape. Since 1992 the water from the Sundays River Valley has been supplied to Gqeberha.

See also

 List of rivers in South Africa

References 

 
Rivers of the Eastern Cape